Lee In-hye (이인혜; born 21 February 1981) is a South Korean actress.

Career
Lee started her career as child actress in 1992 at her age 11 years old, and appeared on a lot of TV dramas like The King's Path (1998, MBC), Spread Your Dreams (1999, EBS), School 3 (2000, KBS), Delightful Girl Choon-Hyang (2005, KBS), etc. In 2007, she appeared on KBS drama Insoon Is Pretty as Insoon's rival in love, Han Jae-eun. In 2009, it was revealed that In-hye became an adjunct professor of the Broadcasting and Entertainment department at Korean Broadcasting & Art School. In 2010, her study tip book, 이인혜의 꿈이 무엇이든 공부가 기본이다, topped the bestseller list that she learned as a top student in school.
In 2011, Lee appeared in the KBS historical drama Gwanggaeto, The Great Conqueror as Yak-yeon, stepdaughter of Ko Mu and later Queen of Goguryeo. In 2012, she appeared in the KBS drama special Disappearance of a Congressman and E-channel sitcom Firm Family.
In 2013, she became a full-time professor of Seoul Arts College, and took on dual roles in the KBS drama special Mother's Island as a mysterious woman and ghost. She appeared on the TV Chosun period drama Into the Flames in 2014 and KBS drama My Fair Lady in 2016. In 2018, Lee took on lead role in the SBS daily drama I Am the Mother Too.

Filmography

Television drama and sitcom 
 JTBC《Graceful Friends》 as Yoo Eun-sil (2020)
 SBS《I Am the Mother Too》as Yoon Ji-young (2018)
 KBS《My Fair Lady》as Heo Jae-kyung (2016)
 TV Chosun《Into the Flames》as Jang Ok-seon (2014)
 KBS《Mother's Island》as Ms. Kim (2013)
 E Channel《Short Family》as In-hye (2012-2013)
 KBS《Disappearance of a Congressman》as Miss Lee (2012)
 KBS《Gwanggaeto, The Great Conqueror》as Yak-yeon (2011-2012)
 KBS《Legend of the Patriots》as Jeong-hwa (2010)
 KBS《Empress Cheonchu》as Empress Seonjeong (2009)
 OCN《Love Is Delicious》as Han Yeo-kyung (2008)
 KBS《Unstoppable Marriage》as Park Eun-young (2007-2008)
 KBS《Insoon Is Pretty》as Han Jae-eun (2007)
 KBS《Hwang Jini》as Dan-sim (2006)
 KBS《Golden Apple》as Jung Hong-yeon (2005-2006)
 KBS《Dangerous Love》as Yoon Su-jeong (2005)
 KBS《Delightful Girl Choon-Hyang》as Han Dan-hee (2005)
 KBS《Kkakdugi》as Hyun-deok (2004)
 MBC《Don't Cry, Mommy!》as Yeon-joo (2003)
 SBS《Sunflower of Winter》as Yoo-jin (2003)
 SBS《The Woman》as Ma Bok-nam (2002)
 KBS《Magic Kid Masoori》as Kim Kang-hee (2002-2004)
 MBC《Golden Waggon》as Lee Min-joo (2002-2003)
 KBS《Dongyang Theater》as Ok-sim (2001)
 KBS《In The Flower Garden》as Kwon Hyun (2001)
 SBS《Money.com》(2000)
 SBS《Parades》as In-hye (2000)
 KBS《School 3》as Yoo Da-in (2000-2001)
 EBS《Spread Your Dreams》as Jang Yoo-jin (1999)
 EBS《Tomorrow》as Hee-joo (1999)
 MBC《The King's Path》as Queen Jeongsun (1998)
 KBS《New Generation Report : Adults Don't Know》as Lee Yoon-kyung etc. (1997-1998)
 MBC《Desires》(1997)
 EBS《Generation of Sensitivity》as Yoo Min-hee (1996-1998)
 KBS《Love Blossoms Season》(1996)
 MBC《Their Hugs》(1996)
 MBC《Chanpumdanja》as young Lee Yong-deok (1995)
 MBC《General Hospital》as Oh Yoon-soo (1995)
 EBS《Always Blue Hearts》as Min Se-hee (1995)
 MBC《Happiness》(1995)
 SBS《Lawyer Park Bong-sook》(1994-1995)
 KBS《Han Myeong-hoe》as young Queen Ansun (1994)
 MBC《About Meeting the Perfect Guy》as young Geum-joo (1994)
 SBS《Father》(1993)
 MBC《Song of Angels》(1992)

Film 
 《A Tale of Legendary Libido》guest starring (2008)
 《Mapado 2》guest starring (2007)

Play and musical 
 《Trial about Donkey's Shadow》as daughter of horseman (Play, 2005)
 《Fiddler on the Roof》as Bielke (Musical, 1992)

Music video 
 Oh Yoon-hye <bruises> (2011)
 Jun Jin <Love Doesn't Come> (2006)
 Seo Mun-tak <Chain> (2000)

Other works

Television show 
 KBS Busan《BUNESCO Committee》as MC (2016-2017) 
 TBS《TV Bookstore Booksori》as MC (2016-2017)
 Channel IT《IT Square》as MC (2012)
 Mnet《The Dizzy Blind Dates》as MC (2012)
 XTM《Rival Match》as MC (2011)
 SBS《Go, Gold Misses》(2010)
 QTV《Ranking Ladies》(2009-2011)
 KBS《TV Kindergarten Hana-Dul-Set》as MC (1999-2000)
 SBS《Among Ourselves, Our Ages》(1994-1995)
 SBS《To The World, Sing-Sing-Sing》(1994-1995)

etc. 
 professor of Kyungsung University (2015-)
 professor of Seoul Arts College (2013-2015)
 writing : <Super Stars> (2011)
 writing : <Studying Is First of All Whatever Your Dream Is> (2010)
 pictorial : <Lee In-hye's Star Photo Album> (2009)
 adjunct professor of Korean Broadcasting & Art School (2009-2012)
 featuring KBS《School 3》OST : <First Love>, <Hey, Yeh!> (2000)
 runner-up in Miss Bingrae Pageant (1994)
 won Grand Prize in Asia-Pacific Traditional Children's Song Contest (1993)
 won Excellence Prize in KBS Children's Song Creation Contest (1992)
 member of MBC Children's Choir (1991-1992)

Awards and nominations 
 won - 2013 Korea Cable TV Awards : Star of the Year (《Short Family》)
 nominated - 2010 KBS Drama Awards : Best Supporting Actress (《Legend of the Patriots》)
 nominated - 2000 KBS Drama Awards : Best New Actress (《School 3》)

References

External links
 
 
 

1981 births
Living people
South Korean television actresses
South Korean film actresses
South Korean child actresses
Actresses from Seoul
20th-century South Korean actresses
21st-century South Korean actresses
South Korean stage actresses
South Korean musical theatre actresses